Ptychodera is a genus of acorn worm.

Species
 Ptychodera bahamensis Spengel, 1893
 Ptychodera ceylonica author unknown
 Ptychodera erythrea Spengel
 Ptychodera flava Eschscholtz, 1825
 Ptychodera pelsarti Dakin, 1916

References
 http://jcs.biologists.org/cgi/content/abstract/s2-40/157/165

External links

 Image

Enteropneusta